Couette may refer to:

 Maurice Couette (18581943), French physicist, especially concerning viscous fluids
 Couette flow, fluid dynamics of viscous fluid between two surfaces
 Stokes-Couette flow, where one surface is oscillating
 Taylor–Couette flow, between two rotating cylinders